Parabellum were a Colombian extreme metal band from Medellín active in the 1980s. The band was described by Terrorizer magazine as one of the world's first black metal bands, as well as the first extreme metal band from Colombia and one of the first from all South America. According to writer Emilio Cuesta, Øystein "Euronymous" Aarseth—a musician associated with the early Norwegian black metal scene—has said Parabellum and Medellín's Reencarnación were both influential to his own band Mayhem.

Parabellum were formed in Medellín, Antioquia, in early 1983 by drummer Cipriano Álvarez and guitarist Carlos Mario Pérez. It took the band until 1987 to release their debut single, the two track Sacrilegio, limited to 500 copies. This was followed up with a second EP, Mutación por radiación, in 1988, limited to 600 copies. Sacrilegio was reissued in 1992, again limited to 500 copies, and a bootlegged version surfaced with an added third track ("Guerra, Monopolio, Sexo"). Adam Ganderson of Terrorizer describes their music as "somewhere between hardcore and bizarrely backwards speed metal riffing ... one of those inimitable sounds that can only be generated by accident. Seriously, this is some of the weirdest, most intense music ever to blast from the gutters." The band also makes a brief appearance in Víctor Gaviria's film Rodrigo D: No Future.

Blasfemia Records released the Tempus Mortis compilation in 2005, which consists of the band's two EPs, six previously unreleased rehearsal tracks from 1984 to 1985, and a video track from the 1985 La Batalla de la Bandas festival. According to Zero Tolerance magazine, "the sound that Parabellum created was one of unprecedented nihilism, evil and extremity. [...] They were pioneers and sonic adventurers operating in a world of violence, squalor and geographical isolation."

Members
 Cipriano Álvarez (drums)
 John Jairo Martínez (guitar)
 Ramón Reinaldo Restrepo (vocals)
 Carlos Mario Pérez ("La Bruja") (guitar)

Discography

 Sacrilegio (EP, Discos Fuentes, 1987)
 Mutación por radiación (EP, Sonolux, 1988)
 Tempus Mortis (compilation, Blasfemia, 2005)

References



Colombian black metal musical groups
Colombian death metal musical groups
Musical groups from Medellín
Musical groups established in 1983
Rock en Español music groups